Ivan Igorevich Repyakh (born 18 October 2001) is a Russian professional footballer who plays as a midfielder for Kuban Krasnodar.

Club career
He made his debut in the Russian Football National League for FC Spartak-2 Moscow on 14 November 2018 in a game against FC Sibir Novosibirsk.

On 24 September 2020, Repyakh signed with Danish Superliga club Vejle. His contract was terminated on 20 January 2022 after making two appearances for the club.

References

External links
 Profile by Russian Football National League

2001 births
Sportspeople from Krasnodar
Living people
Russian footballers
Russia youth international footballers
Association football midfielders
FC Krasnodar players
FC Spartak Moscow players
FC Spartak-2 Moscow players
Vejle Boldklub players
FC SKA Rostov-on-Don players
FC Urozhay Krasnodar players
Russian First League players
Danish Superliga players
Russian expatriate footballers
Expatriate men's footballers in Denmark
Russian expatriate sportspeople in Denmark